P. chinensis  may refer to:
 Pardanthus chinensis, a synonym for Iris domestica, the blackberry lily, leopard flower or leopard lily, an ornamental plant species
 Polistes chinensis, a wasp species

See also
 Chinensis (disambiguation)